Thomas E. Zych (born January 24, 1940) is a Democratic politician from St. Louis, Missouri.  Zych formerly served in the Missouri House of Representatives and later as President of the St. Louis Board of Aldermen.

Zych was educated at St. Mary's High School in St. Louis and attended Southeast Missouri State University.  He graduated from Washington University in St. Louis with a degree in secondary education.  He was elected to the Missouri House of Representatives in 1974.

In the 1980s, he served two terms as President of the St. Louis Board of Aldermen. He did not run for the office in 1987, when Zych faced charges, of which he was later acquitted, that he and several others had defrauded the city of St. Louis in their attempts to get a franchise for cable Television in 1983.

In 1989, Zych became a Methodist minister, subsequently serving two Bootheel congregations. In 2005, he became an employee of Recreation
Division of the St. Louis Department of Parks He later became the director of the Cherokee Recreation Center in Benton Park, St. Louis.

References

Living people
1940 births
Members of the Missouri House of Representatives
Washington University in St. Louis alumni
Members of the St. Louis Board of Aldermen